Pontophoca is an extinct genus of earless seals from the middle-late Miocene of the eastern Paratethys basin and the North Sea.

Fossils
There are two recognized species of Pontophoca, P. sarmatica and P. jutlandica. P. sarmatica is known from middle Miocene marine deposits in the eastern Paratethys basin, while fossils of P. jutlandica have been found in the Tortonian-age Gram Formation in Denmark.

References

Miocene pinnipeds
Monachines
Prehistoric carnivoran genera
Prehistoric pinnipeds of Europe
Fossil taxa described in 1941